"We All Sleep Alone" is the second official single from Cher's self-titled eighteenth album Cher, released on January 28, 1988 by Geffen Records. The single was also released on VHS containing the music video, as directed by Cher.

Song information
This song was written and produced by Desmond Child, Jon Bon Jovi and Richie Sambora. This song was remixed over a decade later by Todd Terry for her 1998 album Believe.

Critical reception
AllMusic highlighted the song on her 1987 self-titled album.

Music video

There are two versions of videos for "We All Sleep Alone". the first is only with Cher and Camilletti in a big bedroom, the second version including a footage from the first and clip with dancers in the streets and her on a stage.

On March 31, 1988, this video was released as a promo on VHS tape in the US. In 2004, it was officially released on DVD in the video compilation, The Very Best of Cher: The Video Hits Collection.

Live performances
Cher performed the song on the following concert tours:
Heart of Stone Tour
Love Hurts Tour
Do You Believe? Tour
The Farewell Tour (sung on the first leg of the tour only)

Track listing
US and European 7" and cassette single
"We All Sleep Alone" (Remix) – 3:53
"Working Girl" – 3:57

European 12" and CD single
"We All Sleep Alone" (Remix) – 3:53
"Working Girl" – 3:57
"I Found Someone" – 3:42

Charts

References

External links
 Official Cher site

Songs about sleep
Songs about loneliness
1980s ballads
1988 songs
1988 singles
Cher songs
Songs written by Desmond Child
Songs written by Jon Bon Jovi
Songs written by Richie Sambora
Rock ballads
Geffen Records singles
Song recordings produced by Desmond Child
Articles containing video clips